Leptaxis simia is a species of small air-breathing land snail, terrestrial pulmonate gastropod mollusks in the family Helicidae.

Subspecies 
 Leptaxis simia simia
 Leptaxis simia hyaena (R. T. Lowe, 1852)

The subspecies Leptaxis simia hyaena (R. T. Lowe, 1852) endemic to Bugio, Madeira is globally extinct.

Distribution 
This species of land snail lives in Madeira, Portugal.

References

Leptaxis